The Yield Tour was a concert tour by the American rock band Pearl Jam to support its fifth album, Yield.

History
Pearl Jam promoted Yield with tours in Oceania, and North America in 1998. Following the tour of Australia and before its summer tour of North America began, drummer Jack Irons left the band due to dissatisfaction with touring, marked his last tour with the band. Pearl Jam's sound engineer Brett Eliason stated, "We went and did Hawaii and Australia with Jack. When we came back, Jack wasn't in a position to carry on. He made that decision more or less by himself. He can be a really great drummer but he had difficulty on tour putting out the energy for the length of shows they were doing. I don't know if he thought they'd put things on hold for him." He was replaced on an initially temporary basis with former Soundgarden drummer Matt Cameron. Cameron said, "I got a phone call out of the blue, from Mr. Ed Ved, Stoney and Kelly. I was ambushed. It was really short notice. He called and said 'hey what are you doing this summer?'" Cameron learned over 80 songs in two weeks.

Pearl Jam's summer tour of North America marked the band's return to full-scale touring and the use of Ticketmaster, when previously the band had protested against the use of Ticketmaster. For this tour and future tours, Pearl Jam once again began using it in order to "better accommodate concertgoers." The first leg of the tour focused on the West Coast of the United States and the Midwest, and then the band moved to the East Coast for the tour's second leg. Cameron stated, "The guys made me feel real welcome and it wasn't a struggle to get it musically, but my style was a little bit different, I think, than what they were used to. And they've been through so many different drummers, I don't even know if they knew what they wanted. So, I just kind of played the way I played and then eventually we kind of figured out what worked best for the band." During the tour an organized fan campaign dubbed the "Breath Campaign" was started in which fans brought signs to shows requesting the song "Breath". After a four-year absence, "Breath" finally made a return appearance at the band's September 11, 1998 show in New York City at Madison Square Garden. The North American summer tour was a big success, and after it was completed the band released its first live album, Live on Two Legs, which featured select performances from the tour. Guitarist Mike McCready stated that the band released the live album due to the strength of Pearl Jam's shows on the tour.

Tour dates
Information taken from various sources.

Band members
Jeff Ament – bass guitar
Stone Gossard – rhythm and lead guitar
Mike McCready – lead guitar
Eddie Vedder – lead vocals, guitar
Jack Irons – drums (warm-up shows and South Pacific leg)
Matt Cameron – drums (North America legs 1 and 2)

Songs performed

Originals
"Alive"
"All Those Yesterdays"
"Animal"
"Around the Bend"
"Better Man"
"Black"
"Blood"
"Brain of J."
"Breath"
"Corduroy"
"Daughter"
"Dead Man"
"Dissident"
"Do the Evolution"
"Elderly Woman Behind the Counter in a Small Town"
"Even Flow"
"Faithfull"
"Footsteps"
"Given to Fly"
"Go"
"Habit"
"Hail, Hail"
"Hard to Imagine"
"I Got Id"
"I'm Open" (snippet)
"Immortality"
"In Hiding"
"In My Tree"
"Indifference"
"Jeremy"
"Last Exit"
"Leatherman"
"Long Road"
"Lukin"
"Mankind"
"MFC"
"No Way"
"Not for You"
"Nothingman"
"Oceans"
"Off He Goes"
"Once"
"Pilate"
"Porch"
"Present Tense"
"Push Me, Pull Me"
"Rats"
"Rearviewmirror"
"Red Mosquito"
"Release"
"Smile"
"Sometimes"
"Spin the Black Circle"
"State of Love and Trust"
"Tremor Christ"
"Untitled"
"W.M.A." (snippet)
"Whipping"
"Who You Are"
"Wishlist"
"Yellow Ledbetter"

Covers
"Act of Love" (Neil Young)
"Androgynous Mind" (Sonic Youth) (snippet)
"Angie" (The Rolling Stones) (snippet)
"Another Brick in the Wall" (Pink Floyd) (snippet)
"Baba O'Riley" (The Who)
"Beast of Burden" (The Rolling Stones)
"Beginning to See the Light" (The Velvet Underground) (snippet)
"Candle in the Wind" (Elton John) (snippet)
"Cinnamon Girl" (Neil Young) (snippet)
"Come Together" (The Beatles) (snippet)
"Crazy Mary" (Victoria Williams)
"Don't Let the Sun Catch You Crying" (Gerry & the Pacemakers) (snippet)
"Dueling Banjos" (Eric Weissberg and Steve Mandel) (snippet)
"Fuckin' Up" (Neil Young)
"Happy Birthday" (traditional)
"Hey Hey, My My (Into the Black)" (Neil Young) (snippet)
"Hunger Strike" (Temple of the Dog) (snippet)
"I Am a Patriot" (Steven Van Zandt) (snippet)
"I Believe in Miracles" (Ramones) (snippet)
"I Got You" (Split Enz) (snippet)
"I Hope I Never" (Split Enz) (snippet)
"I Must Not Think Bad Thoughts" (X) (snippet)
"I Wanna Live" (Iggy Pop) (snippet)
"I Want You to Want Me" (Cheap Trick) (snippet)
"I've Been Tired" (Pixies) (snippet)
"Institutionalized" (Suicidal Tendencies) (snippet)
"Interstellar Overdrive" (Pink Floyd) (snippet)
"Jersey Girl" (Tom Waits) (snippet)
"The KKK Took My Baby Away" (Ramones)
"Last Kiss" (Wayne Cochran)
"Leaving Here" (Edward Holland, Jr.)
"Magic Bus" (The Who) (snippet)
"MLK" (U2) (snippet)
"Monkey Gone to Heaven" (Pixies) (snippet)
"Mother" (John Lennon with the Plastic Ono Band) (snippet)
"My City Was Gone" (The Pretenders) (snippet)
"My Generation Blues" (The Who)
"My Heart Will Go On" (Celine Dion) (snippet)
"The Noise of Carpet" (Stereolab) (snippet)
"Outshined" (Soundgarden) (snippet)
"Pebbles" (Shudder to Think) (snippet)
"Philadelphia Freedom" (Elton John) (snippet)
"Rain" (The Beatles) (snippet)
"Ray of Light" (Madonna) (snippet)
"The Real Me" (The Who) (snippet)
"Roam" (The B-52's) (snippet)
"Rockin' in the Free World" (Neil Young)
"Save It for Later" (The Beat) (snippet)
"Soldier of Love (Lay Down Your Arms)" (Arthur Alexander)
"Sonic Reducer" (The Dead Boys)
"Stuff and Nonsense" (Split Enz) (snippet)
"Suck You Dry" (Mudhoney) (snippet)
"Surrender" (Cheap Trick) (snippet)
"Sweet Home Alabama" (Lynyrd Skynyrd) (snippet)
"Talk About the Passion" (R.E.M.) (snippet)
"Three Little Birds" (Bob Marley & The Wailers) (snippet)
"Throw Your Arms Around Me" (Hunters & Collectors)
"Time Bomb" (Rancid) (snippet)
"Trouble" (Cat Stevens)
"White Girl" (X) (snippet)
"The Whole of the Moon" (The Waterboys) (snippet)
"The Wrong Child" (R.E.M.) (snippet)
"Yeastie Girls Song" (Yeastie Girls) (snippet)

Gallery

References

1998 concert tours
Pearl Jam concert tours